Gremikha Bay is a bay on the northeastern portion of the Kola Peninsula in the far northwest of Russia, near the closed town of Ostrovnoy (which was formerly known as Gremikha), in the Murmansk Oblast.

References

Bays of Murmansk Oblast